Hampton Towne Centre, formerly Hampton Square Mall, was an enclosed shopping mall in Hampton Township, Michigan, just outside the city of Essexville, Michigan, United States. Built in 1975, the property became a dead mall following the closure of its anchor stores, and ultimately closed in 2010. The building, vacant except for a thrift store, an intermediate school district, and a Michigan Department of Human Services office, is owned by Art Dore.

History
The mall was developed by Ramco-Gershenson Properties Trust of Southfield, Michigan, with Charles N. Agree as the architect. Original anchors were Kmart and William C. Wiechmann Company of Saginaw. Both anchors represented changes for their respective chains: the Kmart (opened in 1974, a year before the remainder of the center) was among its first mall-attached stores, and it was the first Wiechmann's location away from Saginaw. An A&P supermarket was also attached. The mall also included a Perry pharmacy and an MC Sports. In 1981, a customer was charged for murdering his wife while she was working at the Lerner New York store in the mall. In October 1989, the mall expanded with the addition of a J. C. Penney store, which moved from downtown. The mall's main customer base was residents of The Thumb.

The mall became increasingly vacant in the 1990s and early 2000s, particularly after the opening of Bay City Mall in 1991 and the closure of all three anchor stores; J. C. Penney defected to the new mall in 1993, and Kmart closed in 2002. At this point, the mall complex was largely used for non-retail purposes, including a Michigan Department of Human Services office, the Bay-Arenac intermediate school district, and yearly use for the Bay County library's book sales. The mall ultimately closed in September 2010. One of the last remaining tenants, Mandarin House Chinese restaurant, moved to a new location. The Department of Human Services offices have remained after the closure, along with a thrift store called The Cat's Meow located inside the former A&P space.

Local businessman Art Dore purchased the mall in August 2011 and announced plans to reopen it as a mixed-use property featuring offices and retail.

References

2010 disestablishments in Michigan
Abandoned shopping malls in the United States
Buildings and structures in Bay County, Michigan
Shopping malls established in 1975
Shopping malls in Michigan
Charles N. Agree buildings